MV Daronia was a 1930s British oil tanker owned by Anglo-Saxon Petroleum, a British subsidiary of Royal Dutch Shell. She was launched in 1938 by Hawthorn, Leslie in North East England and completed in 1939. She was one of a class of 20 similar tankers built for Anglo-Saxon.

In 1944 Daronia survived being hit by two German torpedoes, and in 1958 she survived being hit by a bomb in an air raid by the CIA. Shell withdrew Daronia from service in 1960 and she was scrapped in November of that year.

Building
Hawthorn, Leslie & Co built Daronia at its Hebburn yard on the River Tyne in North East England as yard number 617. She was launched on 19 December 1938 and completed in February 1939.

Daronia was a motor ship.

Anglo-Saxon registered Daronia at London. Her UK official number was 167186 and her wireless telegraphy call sign was GQGB.

Torpedoed and repaired

On 18 August 1944 Daronia left Durban, South Africa, in ballast and with a deck cargo of empty oil drums and general cargo. She was part of Convoy DN-68, sailing northwards in the Indian Ocean for dispersal further up the coast of East Africa.

At 1941 hrs on 20 August Daronia was between South Africa and Madagascar at a position of  when the Kriegsmarine Type IXD U-boat  commanded by Korvettenkapitän Jürgen Oesten hit her with two torpedoes. These did not sink Daronia, and Captain Ritchie returned her safely to Durban, where she arrived on 26 August and remained for the remainder of World War II. After the war she was repaired and in February 1946 she was returned to service.

Bombed by the CIA

On 28 April 1958 Daronia was in Balikpapan Harbour, in the East Kalimantan Province of Borneo when a Douglas B-26 Invader bomber aircraft, flown by the CIA and painted black and with no markings, attacked the Shell oil terminal there. The Invader bombed a larger tanker, Eagle Oil and Shipping's , setting her on fire and sinking her, and then attacked Daronia.

Daronia and her sister ships had unusually high ventilators for their mid-ship pump rooms. The B-26 dropped a 500-pound (227-kg) bomb that hit her port ventilator, but instead of exploding it bounced off towards her starboard ventilator and then fell harmlessly into the sea. Daronia had a full load of petrol, so if the bomb had detonated the effects would almost certainly have been devastating.

As a consequence Daronia left Balikpapan that same day for the safety of Singapore, taking with her 26 of San Flavianos rescued crew. A further 24 crew from San Flaviano followed a few days later on another Anglo-Saxon tanker, . Shell also evacuated shore-based wives and families to Singapore and suspended its tanker service to Balikpapan.

In June 1958 both the Indonesian and UK governments claimed that the aircraft had been flown by Indonesian rebels. In fact only the radio operator was from the Permesta rebels in North Sulawesi. The B-26, its bombs and its pilot, former USAAF officer William H. Beale, were sent by the CIA as part of US covert support for the rebellion. The CIA pilots had orders to target foreign merchant ships to drive foreign trade away from Indonesian waters, thereby weakening the Indonesian economy and destabilising the Indonesian government of President Sukarno. Shell's suspension of operations and partial evacuation of personnel was exactly what the CIA attack was intended to achieve.

For some months previously, UK Prime Minister Harold Macmillan and Foreign Secretary Selwyn Lloyd had supported US policy to supply Permesta. On 6 May 1958, more than a week after the CIA sank San Flaviano and hit Daronia, Lloyd secretly told US Secretary of State John Foster Dulles that this was still his position. On 18 May, Indonesian forces shot down a different Permesta B-26 and captured its CIA pilot, Allen Pope. Nevertheless, in June 1958 both Indonesia and the UK publicly claimed that the aircraft had been flown by Indonesian rebels, concealing the CIA involvement of which both governments were well aware.

Withdrawal and scrapping
Daronia remained in Shell service until 1960. In November of that year she was scrapped in Hong Kong.

References

Sources
 
 

Ships built on the River Tyne
Steamships of the United Kingdom
1938 ships
Shell plc
Maritime incidents in August 1944
Maritime incidents in 1958
Maritime incidents in Indonesia
Central Intelligence Agency operations
Guided Democracy in Indonesia
Ships of Anglo-Saxon Petroleum